Villa Olmo is a neoclassical villa located in the city of Como, northern Italy.

The villa was commissioned by marquis Innocenzo Odescalchi from Swiss architect Simone Cantoni in 1797. As it was designed to be a summer retreat for the aristocracy, it was built alongside the lake. The villa was named after an elm tree planted in the middle of the ornate gardens, which is no longer alive today.

It was acquired in 1924 by the municipality of Como and today is open to the public only during exhibitions, while the lakeside gardens are freely accessible during the daytime.

External links
 
 Villa Olmo - Alessandro Volta Scientific Association
 Villa Olmo's Lido
 Villa Olmo Exhibition Center (Italian)

Buildings and structures completed in the 19th century
Olmo
Buildings and structures in Como
Neoclassical architecture in Lombardy
Tourist attractions in Lombardy
Gardens in Lombardy
19th-century architecture in Italy